The 1968 Auckland City mayoral election was part of the New Zealand local elections held that same year. In 1968, elections were held for the Mayor of Auckland plus other local government positions including twenty-one city councillors. The polling was conducted using the standard first-past-the-post electoral method.

Background
Incumbent Mayor Roy McElroy of the Citizens & Ratepayers ticket was defeated by his predecessor Dove-Myer Robinson. Labour Party councillor George Forsyth ran again for a second time, however he was refused official party endorsement as Labour officials preferred Robinson as Mayor to McElroy and thought fielding their own candidate would allow McElroy to be re-elected on a split vote. Robinson's promise of a "rapid rail" system to ease Auckland's mounting traffic problems was a major talking point. A new ticket, the Civic Action Party was set up as an anti-rapid rail group, some of whose members were former local body politicians. Facing bitter opposition to his independent candidature Forsyth received half a dozen threatening telephone calls (who did not reveal their names) and even members of his family were abused whilst travelling publicly in buses. Forsyth said he was not worried about the callers but thought it was a "pretty poor state of affairs" that he could not offer himself as a candidate for public office in without encountering "Chicago-style opposition."

Mayoralty results

Councillor results

References

Notes

Mayoral elections in Auckland
1968 elections in New Zealand
Politics of the Auckland Region
1960s in Auckland
October 1968 events in New Zealand